The United Church of Canada is a mainline Protestant denomination that is the largest Protestant Christian denomination in Canada and the second largest Canadian Christian denomination after the Catholic Church in Canada.

The United Church was founded in 1925 as a merger of four Protestant denominations with a total combined membership of about 600,000 members: the Methodist Church, Canada, the Congregational Union of Ontario and Quebec, two-thirds of the congregations of the Presbyterian Church in Canada, and the Association of Local Union Churches, a movement predominantly of the Canadian Prairie provinces. The Canadian Conference of the Evangelical United Brethren Church joined the United Church of Canada on January 1, 1968.

Membership peaked in 1964 at 1.1 million and has declined since that time.  From 1991 to 2001, the number of people claiming an affiliation with the United Church decreased by 8%, the third largest decrease in mainstream Christian denominations in Canada.  In 2011, Statistics Canada reported approximately 2 million people identifying as adherents. The 2021 Canadian Census found that more than 1 million Canadians (3.3% of the population) self-identified with the church, remaining the second-largest Christian denomination in Canada. Church statistics for the end of 2018 showed 388,363 members in 317,051 households under pastoral care, of whom 120,986 attend services regularly in 2,119 communities of faith representing 2,774 congregations.

The United Church has a "council-based" structure, where each council (congregational, regional, or denominational) has specific responsibilities. In some areas, each of these councils has sole authority, while in others, approval of other councils is required before action is taken. (For example, a congregation requires regional council approval before a minister can be called or appointed to the congregation.) The policies of the church are inclusive and liberal: there are no restrictions of gender, sexual orientation or marital status for a person considering entering the ministry; interfaith marriages are recognized; communion is offered to all Christian adults and children, regardless of denomination or age.

History 

In the early 20th century, the main Evangelical Protestant denominations in Canada were the Presbyterian, Methodist and Congregational churches. Many small towns and villages across Canada had all three, with the town's population divided among them. Especially on the prairies, it was difficult to find clergy to serve all these charges, and there were several instances where one minister would serve his congregation, but would also perform pastoral care for the other congregations that lacked a minister. On the prairies, a movement to unite all three major Protestant denominations began, resulting in the Association of Local Union Churches.

Facing a de facto union in the western provinces, the three denominations began a slow process of union talks that eventually produced a Basis for Union.

However, not all elements of the churches involved were happy with the idea of uniting under one roof; a substantial minority of Presbyterians remained unconvinced of the virtues of church union. Their threat to the entire project was resolved by giving individual Presbyterian congregations the right to vote on whether to enter or remain outside the United Church. In the end, 302 out of 4,509 congregations of the Presbyterian Church (211 from southern Ontario) chose to reconstitute themselves as a "continuing" Presbyterian Church in Canada.

Inauguration

The United Church of Canada is an amalgamation of the Union of Methodists, Presbyterian and Congregational churches.

With the three denominations now in agreement about uniting, the church leaders approached the government of Canada to pass legislation concerning transfer of property rights. The legislation passed, June 27, 1924, and was effective June 10, 1925.

The United Church of Canada was inaugurated at a large worship service at Toronto's Mutual Street Arena on June 10, 1925. Participants were handed 38-page order of service containing the full text of the liturgy, prayers, hymns, and music. Hymns from all three churches were sung: "All people that on earth do dwell" from the Scottish Presbyterian psalm tradition; the Methodist favourite "O for a thousand tongues to sing" by Charles Wesley; the Congregationalist "O God of Bethel"; and "When I survey the wondrous cross" by the British Nonconformist, Isaac Watts.

The ecumenical tone of the new church was set at this first General Council. The former Methodist General Superintendent S. D. Chown was considered the leading candidate to become the first Moderator because the Methodist Church made up the largest segment of the new United Church. However, in a surprise move, Dr. Chown graciously stepped aside in favour of George C. Pidgeon, the moderator of the Presbyterian Church and principal spokesperson for the uniting Presbyterians, in the hopes that this would strengthen the resolve of the Presbyterians who had chosen to join the new Church.
Dr. S.D. Chown, United Church was featured on an 8 cent stamp issued by Canada Post on May 30, 1975.

Crest
The crest designed for the new church is a vesica piscis, an early Christian symbol that evoked an upended fish (the initials of the phrase "Jesus Christ, Son of God, Saviour"; in Greek: ἰχθύς, ichthys, meaning "fish"). The central saltire is also the Greek letter Chi, first letter of Χριστός, Greek for "Christ". Within three of the four quadrants are symbols of the founding churches: Presbyterianism (the Burning Bush), Methodism (the dove), and Congregationalism (the open Bible). In the bottom quadrant, the alpha and omega represents the ever-living God (Revelation 1:8). The motto Ut omnes unum sint recalls Christ’s “High Priestly Prayer” in John 17:21: "That all may be one". The entire crest resembles the emblem of the Church of Scotland.

In 2012, the Mohawk phrase "Akwe Nia'tetewá:neren" ("All my relations") was added to the perimeter, and the background colours of the four quadrants of the crest were changed to reflect the traditional colours of a typical First Nations medicine wheel.

1930s
In 1930, just as mergers of the congregations, colleges and administrative offices of the various denominations were completed and the United Church Hymnary was published, Canada was hit by the Great Depression. Although membership remained stable, attendance and givings fell. In the face of overwhelming unemployment, some in the church, both clergy and laity, called for a radical Christian socialist alternative such as the Fellowship for a Christian Social Order. Other more conservative members felt drawn to the message of the Oxford Group that focussed on the wealthier members of society. The great majority of members between these two extremes simply sought to help the unemployed.

In the United States, Methodists had been ordaining women from 1880, but it was still a contentious issue in Canada, and it was not until 1936 that the Reverend Lydia Emelie Gruchy of Saskatchewan Conference became the first woman in the United Church to be ordained and, in 1953, she became the first Canadian woman to receive an honorary Doctor of Divinity degree.

1940s
The Second World War was also a divisive issue. Some who had declared themselves pacifist before the war now struggled to reconcile their philosophy with the reality around them. Others remained pacifist—some 65 clergy signed A Witness Against War in 1939. But the church as a whole, although it did not support conscription, supported the overall war effort, both on the home front and by providing chaplains for the armed forces.

Although the forced relocation of Japanese Canadians away from the West Coast was supported by most members across Canada, church leaders and missionaries in B.C. spoke out against it, and the churches on the West Coast set up an Emergency Japanese Committee to help fight for the rights of the dislocated people.

In 1943, the Anglican Church invited other denominations to union talks, and the United Church responded enthusiastically; by 1946, the two churches had issued a statement on mutual ministry. In a similar ecumenical vein, the United Church was one of the founding bodies of the Canadian Council of Churches in 1944 and the World Council of Churches in 1946.

In 1925, The United Church assumed responsibility for 12 native residential schools that were designed to assimilate native children into Canadian culture.  By the 1940s, thinking had begun to change about the underlying assumptions, and in 1949, the church began to close the schools in its care.  The last residential school under United Chuch stewardship closed in 1969.

1950s
The United Church continued to espouse causes that were not politically popular, issuing statements supporting universal health care and the People's Republic of China at its 15th General Council (1952-54) at a time when these were considered radical concepts in North America.

Membership and givings increased dramatically as post-war parents started to bring their young families—the Baby Boomers—to church.

Talks with the Anglican Church had not made significant headway during the decade, but in 1958, the two churches decided to continue the conversation.

1960s
In 1962, two women's auxiliary organizations, Woman's Association and Woman's Missionary Society, join together to form the United Church Women (UCW). That same year, the United and Anglican Churches jointly published Growth in Understanding, a study guide on union, and on June 1, 1965 the Principles of Union between the United Church and the Anglican Church. The spirit of ecumenism with other denominations stayed strong throughout the decade, culminating in 1968 when the Canada Conference of The Evangelical United Brethren Church joined the United Church.

The high tide mark of membership was reached in 1965 when the church recorded 1,064,000 members. However, there were already rumblings of discontent in the church: that same year, Pierre Berton wrote The Comfortable Pew, a bestseller that was highly critical of Canadian churches, and a United Church Commission on Ministry in the 20th Century was appointed in response to growing frustration from congregations, presbyteries, and ministers about the role of ministry. The church lost 2,027 members in 1966, a decline of only two-tenths of a percent, but significantly it marked the first time since amalgamation that membership had fallen.

The Vietnam War brought new controversies to the church when in 1968, the secretary of the national Evangelism and Social Service Committee, the Reverend Ray Hord, offered emergency aid to American Vietnam draft dodgers; the General Council Executive disassociated itself from the decision but within two years it became church policy.

1970s
In 1971, the ecumenical movement reached its height as a joint commission the United and Anglican Churches and the Disciples of Christ approved a Plan of Union, and The Hymn Book, a joint publication of the United and Anglican Churches was published. The tide quickly turned though, and in 1975, the Anglican House of Bishops and National Executive Council declared that the Plan of Union was unacceptable. However, the Anglican, Lutheran, Presbyterian, Catholic, and United churches did agree to recognize the validity of Christian baptisms performed in any of these denominations.

Membership continued to decline slowly throughout the decade, despite a report that lay ministry was on the increase.

1980s
In 1980, at the 29th General Council, the commissioning of diaconal ministers as a part of ordered ministry was approved.

On August 16, 1980, the 28th General Council elected the first female Moderator, the Reverend Lois Wilson.

On August 17, 1980, a United Church of Canada task force released In God's Image, its report on sexual ethics which recommended the admission of homosexuals into the ministry and tolerance of premarital sex. Although the report accepted abortion under qualified circumstances, it rejected abortion on demand.

With union talks with the Anglicans already at end, talks with the Disciples of Christ also ended in 1985.

In 1986, the 31st General Council elected a female Moderator, Anne M. Squire.

In 1988, the 32nd General Council chose to end investment in South Africa, apologize to First Nations congregations for past denials of native spirituality by the church, and elected the first Moderator of Asian descent, Sang Chul Lee. However, those events were largely overshadowed when the commissioners passed a statement called Membership, Ministry and Human Sexuality that stated "all persons, regardless of sexual orientation, who profess their faith in Jesus Christ are welcome to be or become members of The United Church of Canada" and that "all members of the United Church are eligible to be considered for ordered ministry." Taken together, these two statements opened the door for openly gay men and women to join the ministry.  Many members opposed this, and over the next four years, membership fell by 78,184. In some cases, entire congregations split, with a sizeable faction—sometimes led by the minister—leaving to form an independent church. Some of those opposed to the gay ordination issue chose to stay in the church, and formed the Community of Concern, a voice of conservatism within the church.

1990s
In the 1990s, the United Church faced the legacy of cultural assimilation and child abuse in the residential schools that it had once helped to operate.

On May 24, 1992, Tim Stevenson was the first openly gay minister ordained by the United Church of Canada.

On August 17, 1992, the first Native Canadian (First Nations) Moderator, the Reverend Stan McKay, a Cree man, was elected at the 34th General Council. Two years later, the church established a "Healing Fund". This was followed in 1998 by an apology made by the church to former students of United Church Indian Residential Schools.

At the 35th General Council in 1994, commissioners voted to have General Councils every three years rather than every two years. This also increased the length of term of Moderators from two to three years.

The original General Council office of the church built in 1925 resided on increasingly valuable land on St. Clair Avenue in downtown Toronto, Ontario. In 1995, facing increasing financial pressure from falling donations, the church sold the building and moved out to the suburb of Etobicoke.

In 1996, a new hymnary, Voices United, replaced the joint United-Anglican The Hymn Book. Response from congregations was enthusiastic, and by 2010, over 300,000 copies had been printed.

In 1996, the Committee on Archives and History compiled the "Guide to family history research in the archival repositories of the United Church of Canada".

In 1997, the Reverend Bill Phipps was elected Moderator at the 36th General Council. Controversy again descended on the church when later the same year, Phipps stated in an interview that 'I don't believe Jesus was God' and that he did not believe that Jesus physically rose from the dead.

2000s
In the new century, membership and givings both continued to drop, and in 2001 the General Council offices were reorganized as a cost-cutting measure.

In 2005, the church urged the Canadian Parliament to vote in favour of same-sex marriage legislation; after the legislation had been passed, the church urged the government not to reopen the issue.

The church continued to deal with the consequences of the Native residential school issue. In 2005, the church welcomed the Agreement in Principle announced by the Government of Canada and the Assembly of First Nations, which outlined a comprehensive resolution package for former students of Indian Residential Schools; and the following year, the church agreed to sign the Indian Residential Schools Settlement Agreement.

In 2006, the 39th General Council approved the use of a generous bequest to start up "Emerging Spirit", a promotional campaign aimed at drawing 30- to 40-year-olds into a conversation about faith. As part of this campaign, "Emerging Spirit" used controversial magazine advertisements featuring, among other images, a bobble-head Jesus, a marriage cake with two grooms holding hands, Jesus sitting on Santa's chair in a mall, and a can of whipped cream with the caption "How much fun can sex be before it's a sin?".

2010s
In 2012, the 41st General Council elected Gary Paterson as the first openly gay Moderator. The commissioners also voted to invite First Nations peoples to become signatories to the Basis of Union. (In 1925, several aboriginal congregations of the original founding churches were automatically made part of the new United Church although the congregations had not been asked to participate in church Union negotiations, and had not been asked to sign the Basis of Union document.) In addition, the original church crest (adopted in 1944 with French added in 1980) was modified by changing the background colours of the four quadrants of the crest, as well as adding the Mohawk phrase "Akwe Nia'Tetewá:neren" ("All my relations") to the crest's perimeter.

After much debate, Commissioners also voted to adopt the recommendations of the Report of the Working Group on Israel/Palestine Policy, which included a boycott of products from Israeli settlements and a campaign of "encouraging members of the United Church to avoid any and all products produced in the settlements." This was the church's first boycott since an anti-apartheid boycott against South Africa in the 1980s. According to the report, the authors consulted with Canadian-based Palestinian organizations, as well as "Jewish rabbis, individuals and organizations" among others. Still it incited controversy, with several groups campaigning against the decision, including protests of the decision by several Canadian Jewish groups.

In 2015, at the 42nd General Council, delegates voted in favour of several "denomination-changing" proposals, including a reorganization from a four-court structure to a three-council structure; elimination of "settlement", the practice of telling newly ordained ministers where they would first serve; reorganization of the process of finding and training ministers; and a new funding model. These changes were subsequently approved by the wider church, and ratified at the 43rd General Council in July 2018.

In 2015, a debate emerged regarding whether or not United Church minister Gretta Vosper, an avowed atheist, was suitable for ministry. The United Church instituted an ecclesiastical hearing that could have led to her dismissal as minister. However, in 2018, Vosper and Toronto Conference reached a settlement in which all outstanding matters were resolved. Vosper continues to serve at West Hill United Church. In response to this internal decision, the offices of the General Council released a statement saying, "This [decision] doesn't alter in any way the belief of the United Church of Canada in God, a God most fully revealed to us as Christians in and through Jesus Christ. Our church's statements of faith over the years have all been grounded in this understanding." A survey of 1,353 "United Church ministry personnel" published by the Vancouver Sun found that "a majority of the respondents (almost 95%) affirmed a belief in God, with a large number (almost 80%) affirming a belief in a supernatural, theistic God".

Public positions and policies

Indigenous people
Until 1969, the United Church of Canada was involved with and supported the Canadian Indian residential school system, which resulted in a painful legacy for many Indigenous people and their communities.  Of approximately 80,000 students alive as of 2009, about 10 percent attended United Church-run schools.

In the late 1990s, the United Church of Canada issued multiple apologies for its complicity in a structurally abusive program of genocide:

In 2019, the United Church of Canada allocated $150,000 (of the previous year's 33.7M in donations) to initiatives aimed at ameliorating the persisting consequences of the government-sponsored, church-operated residential school system for Canada's indigenous communities.

Kindred Works 
In May 2022, Kindred Works, a real estate company, was started in association with the United Church. Kindred Works operates as the asset manager for the United Property Resource Corporation, which is owned by the United Church and tasked with getting positive social utility from church property. Kindred Works aims to renovate existing United Church properties by adding rental units sufficient to house 34,000 people over 15 years. One-third of the new company's projects are planned as below-market rental properties partially financed by the Canada Mortgage and Housing Corporation. All projects will have KPMB Architects as lead designers. At it launch, it had eight projects in progress, four of which, including the St. Luke's United Church are in Toronto, with twenty projected to be started by the end of the year.

Governance and structure
The rules for governance are set out in The Manual, first written in 1925, and updated on a regular basis.

Moderator

The voice and face of the church is the Moderator, who is elected to a three-year term at each General Council. The duties of the Moderator include:
 giving leadership to the church, "quickening in the hearts of the people a sense of God as revealed in Christ, and heartening and strengthening the whole United Church".
 visiting communities of faith across the country, "giving sympathetic guidance and counsel in all its affairs".
 being the primary spokesperson for the United Church
 presiding at the meetings of the denominational council, its Executive, and its Sub-Executive.

Currently, the Carmen Lansdowne holds the position following her election at the 44th General Council in August 2022.

Governance structure

For the first 92 years of its existence, administration was shared among four courts, or levels:
 pastoral charges, the primary ministry unit of the United Church, were composed of one or more congregations or preaching points. 
 pastoral charges were members of local area presbyteries or districts, of which there were 88. 
 presbyteries were gathered into regional conferences, of which there were 13. 
General Council, the church's highest legislative court, was elected and met every three years.

In 2019 the church moved to a three-council model: 
 communities of faith, which will include all pastoral charges, congregations, and other groups who gather regularly for worship. 
 regional councils, of which there will be 16. 
 denominational council, which will continue to be referred to as the General Council.

Ministry

The clergy of the United Church are called "ministers". There are two "streams", ordered ministry and lay ministry. Ordered ministry includes ordained ministers and diaconal ministers. Lay ministry refers to licensed lay worship leaders, designated lay ministers (DLM), sacraments elders and congregational designated ministers (CDM). There are no restrictions on gender, sexual orientation, age, or marital status for any branches of ministry.

Beliefs and practices

Bible
The United Church believes that the Bible is central to the Christian faith and was written by people who were inspired by God. The church also believes that the circumstances under which the books of the Bible were written were of a particular place and time, and some things cannot be reconciled with our lives today, such as slavery and the condemnation of homosexuality. The United Church of Canada uses the historical-critical method of interpreting the bible.

Sacraments
The two sacraments of the United Church are Communion and Baptism.

Communion
Communion is the ritual sharing of the elements of bread and wine (or, more commonly, grape juice) as a remembrance of the Last Supper that Jesus shared with his followers. It is usually celebrated at a table at the front of the sanctuary, where the minister blesses the elements before they are distributed to the congregation. The Church practises open communion, with no restriction regarding age or membership, as the sacrament is open to young children and Christians from other denominations.

The actual distribution can take several forms, including passing a tray of bread cubes and another tray of small juice glasses from person to person, and then eating the bread and drinking the juice in unison; and "intinction", where each person takes a piece of bread, dips it into a cup of juice and then eats the juice-soaked bread.

There is no guideline for frequency. Some congregations celebrate communion once a month, others on a quarterly basis.

Baptism
Baptism is the first step in church membership, where the parents make a profession of faith on behalf of the infant in the hope that their child will later confirm that profession at or around the age of 13.

The United Church practices infant baptism, but in cases where a person was not baptized as an infant, baptism can be performed at any age. In the case of infant baptism, the parents of the infant, before the congregation, agree to a series of statements about the beliefs of the United Church on behalf of their child. They also promise to encourage the child to seek full membership at an appropriate time. The members of the congregation also promise the parents that they will help to raise the child in a Christian community. The minister then places water on the candidate's head three times (expressing the Trinity of Father, Son and Holy Spirit) and traces a cross on the person's forehead with water. Baptism by immersion is also an option for adults who request it.

In the 1970s, the United Church reached an ecumenical agreement with the Presbyterian, Lutheran, Catholic, and Anglican churches in Canada that baptisms within these churches are mutually recognized as valid. Further to that, the United Church recognizes the validity of any baptism by another denomination that was performed with water and in the name of the Father, Son and Holy Spirit.

Inclusiveness
The church attempts to welcome everyone, regardless of age, race, class, gender, sexual orientation, or physical ability. In the same manner, there is also no restriction on those interested in entering ministry.

Marriage
The United Church recognizes and celebrates all legal marriages, including same-sex couples, previously divorced people, and couples of different religions. The actual policy of whom to marry is left up to the church council of each community of faith. For instance, one congregation might not allow same-sex marriages to be performed in their building, while another allows all marriages regardless of sexual orientation.

Interfaith relations
The church believes that there are many paths to God. The United Church's path is through Jesus Christ, but the church also recognizes that Christians' understanding of this is limited by an incomplete comprehension of God; their belief is that the Holy Spirit is also at work through other non-Christian faiths.

Abortion
The church supports the right of women to have access to safe abortions that are covered by provincial health care, but also supports better access to contraception, sexual education, and counselling that might eventually make abortion unnecessary.

Membership
A full member is one who has been baptised, either as infant, child, youth or adult, and has made a public profession of faith before the congregation. Membership is not required in order to worship at a United Church, and many who regularly attend worship are adherents rather than members.

In order to become a full member, a person goes through a process called "confirmation". This is offered to adults (starting at around age 13) and usually involves a series of classes about the beliefs of the United Church. Following this, the candidate makes a public profession of faith before the congregation, thereby "confirming" the statements made by his or her parents during baptism. If the person is unbaptised, the minister baptises the person before the profession of faith. The new member's name is then entered on the official Roll of Members for that congregation.

Benefits of membership
Only members can be a part of a congregation's board or council, and only members can vote at congregational meetings, although members can vote to extend voting privileges to adherents.

Transfer of membership and removal from rolls
Although confirmation takes place at the congregational level, the person is a member of the entire United Church of Canada, not just one congregation; therefore membership can be transferred freely from congregation to congregation.

A congregation may remove members from its roll for non-attendance. (The Manual suggests an absence of three years, but the congregation is free to set its own period of time)

Music
The United Church has issued four hymn books:
 Hymnary (1930)
The Hymn Book (jointly with the Anglican Church of Canada) in 1972
Voices United (1996) is the current hymnal, with over 300,000 copies in print. A supplement, More Voices was published in 2006
 Nos voix unies (2005), the United Church's first French-language hymnal

Criticism from outside the church
A. C. Forrest, the editor of the United Church Observer in the 1960s and 1970s (and by extension the United Church itself) came under strong attack from the Canadian Jewish community for frequent editorial espousal of Palestinian rights in Israel, on the West Bank and in Gaza; many within the United Church were also uncomfortable with Forrest's position, though ultimately the church adjudged a plurality of opinion on this (and other matters) as consistent with United Church open-mindedness.

The National Post has published several articles critical of the United Church of Canada. (August 19, 2009: "United Church is blind to true suffering"; August 14, 2009: "United Church's uncertain future") An article by Charles Lewis, published on May 14, 2011, set out what Lewis sees as the issues that beset the United Church: the church's "big tent" approach to believers, accepting even atheists as members; and lack of doctrinal orthodoxy.

References

Further reading
 Airhart, Phyllis D. A Church with the Soul of a Nation: Making and Remaking the United Church of Canada (MQUP, 2013) excerpt
 Farris, Allan. The Fathers of 1925: The Tide of Time, edited by John S. Moir, Knox College, 1978
 Flatt, Kevin N. After Evangelicalism: The Sixties and the United Church of Canada (2013)
 
 Schweitzer, Don ed. The United Church of Canada: A History. Waterloo, ON: Wilfrid Laurier University Press, 2012. , electronic format  and

External links

 
 
 "Canada's Lead in Church Unity," The Literary Digest, July 4, 1925

 
Christian denominations established in the 20th century
United and uniting churches
Methodist denominations established in the 20th century
Members of the World Council of Churches
Members of the World Communion of Reformed Churches
Christian organizations established in 1925
Presbyterian denominations in Canada
1925 establishments in Canada